Blazer is a surname. Notable people with the surname include:

Chuck Blazer (1945–2017), American soccer administrator
Craig Blazer, soccer coach at DePaul University, USA
Dan Blazer, American psychiatrist
Phil Blazer (born 1936), former American football offensive guard
Yitzchak Blazer (1837–1907), early leader in the Musar movement